Pagan is a volcanic island in the Marianas archipelago in the northwest Pacific Ocean, under the jurisdiction of the Commonwealth of the Northern Mariana Islands. It lies midway between Alamagan to the south, and Agrihan to the north.  The island has been largely uninhabited ever since most of the residents were evacuated due to volcanic eruptions in 1981.

History

Archaeological finds indicate that Pagan was settled from several centuries BC. The first European contact was in 1669, when the island was sighted by the Spanish missionary Diego Luis de San Vitores who named it San Ignacio (Saint Ignatius in Spanish). It is likely that it was previously visited in 1522 by the Spanish sailor Gonzalo de Vigo, deserter from the Magellan expedition in 1521, and the first European castaway in the history of the Pacific. The native Chamorro population was forcibly deported to Saipan in 1695, and then three years later to Guam. The Chamorros began to return to Pagan in the early 19th century, but found that the island had been colonized by freed Kanakas from the Caroline islands. In the 1870s, first coconut plantations were established.

After the sale of the Northern Mariana islands by Spain to the German Empire in 1899, the island was administered as part of the colony of German New Guinea and leased to a private company, the Pagan Society, which traded mainly copra. The company was a partnership between a German and Japanese man. The island was devastated by typhoons in July and September 1905, September 1907 and in December 1913 which destroyed the coconut plantations and bankrupted the Pagan Society. In 1914, during World War I, the island was captured by the Empire of Japan, which was awarded control by the League of Nations as part of the South Seas Mandate. The island was settled by ethnic Japanese and Okinawans, who restored the coconut plantations and raised cotton and sweet potatoes for export. In addition, the Japanese developed commercial fishing for bonito and tuna. An airfield was constructed in 1935, and the Imperial Japanese Navy established a garrison in 1937. In 1942 the Japanese civilian population was 413 persons, with another 229 Chamorro residents. In June 1944 a garrison force of 2,150 men of the Imperial Japanese Army arrived, only to be cut off and isolated by the ongoing Allied offensive. Receiving supplies only occasionally by submarine, the garrison soon faced starvation, and several hundred died of malnutrition before the surrender of Japan. 

After World War II and under United States occupation, Pagan became part of the UN Trust Territory of the Pacific Islands until being granted U.S. Commonwealth status. After the war the United States Navy maintained a small establishment on Pagan and during the 1950s built public institutions, including a church, a copra warehouse, an infirmary and a school house. However the civilian population was under 100 people by the end of the 1970s, many of whom were seasonally present from Saipan. 
On May 15, 1981, Mount Pagan erupted, with lava flows covering a large part of the island's arable land and part of the airfield runway; the island's inhabitants were evacuated to Saipan. The eruption continued until 1985, with further small outbreaks in 1987, 1988, 1992, 1993, 1996, 2006, 2009, 2010, 2012 and 2021. Repeated petitions by the islanders to return have been rejected by US authorities due to the continuing threat posed by the volcano. Efforts are underway by the Northern Islands Mayor's Office and concerned citizens to assist the approximately 300 displaced residents of the Northern Islands who wish to return and resettle in Anatahan, Alamagan, Pagan and Agrigan.

Pagan Island was included during Operation Christmas Drop 2006. United States Air Force C-130 aircrew observed cattle and a small cluster of buildings, including a grass airstrip, located on the island.
Plans by a Japanese investor group to use Pagan as a dumping ground for debris and rubble from the 2011 Tōhoku earthquake and tsunami in Japan were provisionally shelved after protests in June 2012.<ref>Haidee V. Eugenio: No more tsunami debris. Japanese investors will still mine pozzolan.  In: Saipan Tribune, 1. Jun 2012</ref>

Politically, Pagan remains part of the Northern Islands Municipality.

Geography

The island is a double island consisting of two stratovolcanoes joined by a narrow strip of land with a width of only . Although several fumaroles were active in 1992, the southern volcano last erupted in 1864.

Pagan has two large lakes. Both lakes contain brackish water.

Immediately off the northern east coast are the very small and steep rock islets Togari Rock (high) and Hira Rock'', which are listed as separate islands among those islands constituting the Northern Islands Municipality.

Demographics

As of 1980 the population of Pagan often changed as secondary students moved back and forth between their residences on Pagan and their schools on Saipan. In October 1977 Pagan had seven families with a total of 37 people. The resident commissioner's office stated that 51 people lived on Pagan in December 1977. As of 1980 Pagan had nine families with total of 85 people, including some people residing in Saipan.

Education
Previously Commonwealth of the Northern Mariana Islands Public School System operated an elementary school (until grade 6) on Pagan prior to the 1981 eruptions. In 1977 the school had 13 students. Students from Pagan attending secondary school did so on Saipan.

Military live-fire training range plans

In 2013 the US Naval Command filed a proposal to obtain the island for a new group of live-fire and maneuver Ranges and Training Areas (RTAs).

The proposal spawned an online community called Our Islands are Sacred, a petition on Change.org, and rallies against it held by the Sierra Club, Save Pagan Island, Roots Action and Care2Make a Difference.

On April 3, 2015 (HST) the Department of Defense (DoD) released a long-awaited draft of the Environmental Impact Statement (EIS). According to Michael G. Hadfield, a professor of biology at the University of Hawaii-Manoa who led an insect survey team to Pagan in 2010, “Speaking as a biologist, it’s got some really unique things about it. ... It’s not a wasteland, which I think some people envision because it’s got an active volcano. There’s a lot there that’s worth preserving — a couple of endangered bird species and snail species — which I specialize in and is about to hit the U.S. endangered species list.”

Jerome Aldan (died in February 2017), the mayor for CNMI's Northern Islands, which includes Pagan, told a New Zealand radio program that the U.S. military's description of the island as “uninhabited” was false. According to an article by James Cave for the Huffington Post, an article which used Hadfield as its source:

"More than 50 families in Saipan consider Pagan their home island and have plans and desires to return to homesteads," The island is occupied by two people, who live in shacks and have one flushing toilet and plumbing, electricity and small ranch.

According to an April 17, 2015, article by Wyatt Olson for Stars and Stripes military news network, "the [legislature of the Northern Mariana Islands] is considering a joint resolution calling on the governor to oppose the military expansion on the 10-mile-long island. ... In wording that hints at the hornet’s nest the U.S. may have stirred with the proposal, the joint resolution asserts that “throughout the CNMI’s history, foreign powers and outside influences have made major decisions and have dictated the course of development” for the region and that the U.S. “once again stands poised to make some very important decisions with respect to the military utilization of the Northern Islands.” "

On May 15, 2015, a map of the proposed site was made available online.

See also
 Pascal Horst Lehne and Christoph Gäbler: Über die Marianen. Lehne-Verlag, Wohldorf in Germany 1972.
 Pagan
 
 WorldStatesman- Northern Marianas

References

External links

Gallery of photos from a 2010 biological survey
 The Northern Islands – facts on the Northern Islands by the Northern Islands Mayor's Office
 Monitoring Report of The Northern Mariana Island of Pagan

Active volcanoes
Former German colonies
Islands of the Northern Mariana Islands
Stratovolcanoes of the United States
Uninhabited islands of the Northern Mariana Islands
Volcanoes of the Northern Mariana Islands